The 1944 Delaware State Hornets football team represented the State College for Colored Students—now known as Delaware State University—in the 1944 college football season as an independent. Led by first-year head coach Tom Conrad, the Hornets compiled a 2–3 record. The team's captain was Henry Clay Aldridge. Conrad had been hired the year before, but Delaware State did not field a football team in 1943.

Schedule

References

Delaware State
Delaware State Hornets football seasons
Delaware State Hornets football